Mikhail Gomorov was a Soviet actor, film director.

Selected filmography 
 1923 — Glumov's Diary
 1925 — Strike
 1925 — Battleship Potemkin
 1929 — The General Line

References

External links 
 Михаил Гоморов on kino-teatr.ru

Soviet male film actors
1898 births
1981 deaths